The 2011 Aotearoa Film & Television Awards were held at the Viaduct Events Centre in Auckland, New Zealand on the evening of Saturday 12 November, with the crafts awards presented at an earlier luncheon on Thursday 10 November. After previously being known as the Qantas Film and Television Awards, the awards were renamed to the Aotearoa Film and Television Awards in August 2011.

Nominees and Winners 

The Aotearoa Film and Television Craft Awards were announced on Thursday 10 November 2011, and the Aotearoa Film and Television Awards were announced on Saturday 12 November 2011.

Winners are listed first and highlighted in boldface.
Key
 – Non-technical award
 – Technical award

News and Current Affairs

General Television

Documentary

Film

References

External links
 Aotearoa Film & Television Awards

New Zealand film awards
New Zealand television awards
Film and Television Awards
Awards
2010s in New Zealand cinema